The swimming competition at the 2001 Summer Universiade took place in Beijing, People's Republic of China from August 22 to September 1, 2001.

Men's events

Women's events

Medal table

References
 Results on HickokSports
 USA Swimming

Swimming at the Summer Universiade
Universiade
2001 Summer Universiade